Kambamba Kulaxingo (1899 – 15 January 2006), also known as Kambamjiji Kulaxingu, was the King of Baixa de Cassanje until his death in 2006.

In 2002, King Kulaxingo called on the Angolan government to establish a 19th province out of Malanje and Lunda Norte.

References

1899 births
2006 deaths
Angolan politicians